Robophobia is a Big Finish Productions audio drama based on the long-running British science fiction television series Doctor Who. It is a  four-part story.

Plot
The Doctor arrives on a spaceship transporting over a hundred thousand potentially deadly robots.

Cast
The Doctor – Sylvester McCoy
Liv Chenka – Nicola Walker
Farel – Toby Hadoke
Bas Pellico – William Hazell
Selerat – Nicholas Pegg
Cravnet – Dan Starkey
Tal Karus – Matt Addis
Leebar/Computer Voice – John Dorney

Continuity
For the people of Kaldor, this story picks up a few months after the events of the Fourth Doctor television story, The Robots of Death.
The Doctor's TARDIS is black in this story.  It remains this way through subsequent stories and is resolved in Black and White.
Black and White also contains a few scenes that take place directly after Lurkers at Sunlight's Edge, including the Doctor finding the Black TARDIS, and his first trip in it to the spaceship Lorelei, as heard in this story.  There is also a scene where he takes it on its second trip, to the planet Celdor, in The Doomsday Quatrain.

Notes
Dan Starkey has played Sontarans in several recent Doctor Who television stories.
Toby Hadoke is a comedian best known to Doctor Who fans for his one-man show Moths Ate My Doctor Who Scarf.

Critical reception
Doctor Who Magazine reviewer Matt Michael said that the play is a "sequel that compares well to the original", and praised the performance of Walker as Liv Chenka, who is the "guest companion" in the audio.

References

External links
Robophobia

2011 audio plays
Seventh Doctor audio plays
Audio plays by Nicholas Briggs